Count Elliott (also spelled Count Eliot) was a hereditary title in the Holy Roman Empire held by the Eliot military family. The title encompassed Count of the Holy Roman Empire, Comte de Morhange, and Graf von Port Eliot.

History
In 1735 Granville Elliott was set to marry Jeanne Thérèse du Han, Comtesse de Martigny and lady of honour to the Empress of Germany. Prior to their wedding Emperor Charles VI created him Comte de Morhange and he was made a Chamberlain to the Emperor. Over time he eventually became a Count of the Holy Roman Empire.

Granville spent a significant amount of time attempting to prove that Richard Eliot and Catherine Killigrew had married prior to the birth of their son George Elliott. If this were true, it would make Granville the rightful heir to Sir John Eliot and thus Port Eliot, the ancestral home of the Eliot Family and seat of the Earl of St Germans. Despite his attempt failing Granville was given the title Graf von Port Eliot. Upon his death in 1759 the titles where passed to his oldest living son Amable Gaspard Antoine Elliott.

In 1808, after the fall of the Holy Roman Empire, the title Count of the Empire was transferred to the German Empire. Without an heir, Amable Gaspard Antoine Elliott chose his half brother Francis Perceval Eliot to succeed him. Francis thought being in French and German nobility would be improper and died in 1818 without assuming the titles.

List of Counts
1735-59: Granville Elliott (1713-1759), 1st Count Elliott
1759-14: Amable Gaspard Antoine Elliott (1738-1814), 2nd Count Elliott
1814-18: Francis Perceval Eliot (1755-1818), heir to title but never assumed

References

 Count
Counts of Germany